Badya Jattan, next to Badyan Brahmnan, is a village of less than 7,000 population, in Hisar-1 Rural Development Block, Nalwa Chaudhry (Vidhan Sabha constituency) and Hisar (Lok Sabha constituency) of Hisar District of Hisar Division in the Haryana state of India.

History
After Independence of India in 1947, it became part of Punjab. Once Haryana was formed as a separate state in 1966, it became part of the Hisar district, state of Haryana State.

Village has an old temple called Dadi Gauri dhok (Haryanvi: धोक, meaning worship), bhaiyan (Haryanvi: भईयाँ, from भूमिया or of land), or jathera (Punjabi: जठेरा, from जेष्ठ which means elder) village ancestor deity which is the abode of village deity where newlyweds go for blessings before entering the village.

Jaat gotras
The following Jaat gotras are found in the village.

Dalal

Transportation

Road
It is well-connected by the Matelled Asphalt (paved bitumen) road with Hisar (city) 24 km.

Train connectivity
Village does not have a rail station.

Airport connectivity
Currently no commercial domestic or international flights from this airport.

Revenue, Agriculture, Health and Other Services
There is a Patwari (Government Land Records Officer), an Agriculture Development Officer (ADO), a Rural Health Officer (RHO), and an Anganwadi (Community Childcare) worker based at village.

Jan Sahayak e-Governance Services
Government of Haryana services are accessible via their Official website.

Government of India e-governance services can be availed online at their website for various  govt departments including land & revenue (land rights and ownership records), transport (driving license and vehicle registration), health (birth and death certificates), public health (water and sewage connection), food (ration cards), Power (electricity connection) and HUDA or Municipal Committee/council (house tax and building plans), etc.

External links
 Google location map

See also

 Bidhwan
 Badyan Brahmnan
 Kanwari

References

Cities and towns in Hisar district
Villages in Hisar district